The 1958–59 English football season was Aston Villa's 58th season in the Football League, this season playing in the Football League First Division. Villa were relegated for the second time in their history.

Local rival "Wolves" achieved the double over Villa, part of a run of seven between 1957 and 1960.

League table

League results

Results

Appearances
Peter McParland, 47 appearances
Jimmy Dugdale, 47 appearances
Nigel Sims, 47 appearances, conceded 85
Gerry Hitchens, 41 appearances
Vic Crowe, 39 appearances
Jackie Sewell, 38 appearances
Les Smith, 35 appearances
Johnny Dixon, 34 appearances 
Peter Aldis, 33 appearances 
Billy Myerscough, 32 appearances 
Stan Crowther, 29 appearances
Stan Lynn, 27 appearances
Ron Wylie, 26 appearances
Doug Winton, 18 appearances
Pat Saward, 14 appearances
Gordon Lee, 14 appearances
John Sharples, 13 appearances
Derek Pace, 12 appearances
George Ashfield, 9 appearances
Wally Hazelden, 8 appearances
Roy Chapman, 8 appearances
Dennis Jackson, 5 appearances
Ken Barrett, 5 appearances
Les Jones, 5 appearances
Ken Roberts, 2 appearances
Trevor Birch, 2 appearances
Jackie Hinchliffe, 2 appearances
Arthur Sabin, 1 appearance, conceded 1 
Tommy Southren, 1 appearance
Jack Willis, 1 appearances
Bill Beaton, 1 appearances, conceded 6

Exits
Les Smith
Billy Myerscough
Peter Aldis
Wally Hazelden

References

Aston Villa F.C. seasons
Aston Villa F.C. season